The 36th Golden Disc Awards, was an award ceremony held on January 8, 2022, and broadcast through various television networks and streaming platforms in various countries. The ceremony was hosted by Lee Seung-gi, Lee Da-hee, and Sung Si-kyung.

Criteria
All songs and albums that were eligible to be nominated were released between the end of November 2020 and the end of November 2021. Songs and albums that were excluded from the nominations in the 35th edition due to overlapping in the counting deadline were included in this edition.

Winners and nominees

Winners and nominees are listed in alphabetical order. Winners are listed first and emphasized in bold.

Main Awards
The list of nominees for:
 Seezn Most Popular Artist Award were announced on December 20, 2021, through Seezn website.
 remaining categories except Digital Daesang (Song of the Year) and Disc Daesang (Album of the Year) were announced on December 8, 2021, through the official website.
 Digital Daesang (Song of the Year) and Disc Daesang (Album of the Year) were chosen from the winners of Digital Song Daesang and Album Bonsang.

The voting for Seezn Most Popular Artist Award opened on Seezn website on December 20, 2021, and closed on December 31, 2021.

Other awards

Multiple awards
The following artist(s) received three or more awards:

Presenters
The list of presenters was announced on January 3, 2022.

Performers
The first lineup was announced on December 28, 2021. The second lineup was announced on December 30, 2021.

Broadcast

Notes

References

External links
  

2022 in South Korean music
2022 music awards
Golden Disc Awards ceremonies